Stephen of Simmern-Zweibrücken (23 June 1385 – 14 February 1459, Simmern) was Count Palatine of Simmern and Zweibrücken from 1410 until his death in 1459.

Life
He was the son of King Rupert of Germany and his wife Elisabeth of Nuremberg. After the death of Rupert the Palatinate was divided between four of his surviving sons. Louis III received the main part, John received Palatinate-Neumarkt, Stephen received Palatinate-Simmern and Otto received Palatinate-Mosbach.

In 1410, Stephen married Anna of Veldenz, who died in 1439. After the death of Anna's father in 1444, Stephen also gained control of Veldenz and of the Veldenz share of Sponheim. In the same year, he also divided the country between his sons Frederick I, who became Count Palatine of Simmern, and Louis I, who became Count Palatine of Zweibrücken. In 1448 he succeeded to one part of Palatinate-Neumarkt and sold the other to his younger brother Otto.

He was buried in the Schlosskirche, formerly the church of the Knights Hospitallers in Meisenheim.

Family
Stefan of Simmern-Zweibrücken and Anna of Veldenz had issue:
 Anne (1413 – 12 March 1455)
 Margaret (1416 – 23 November 1426)
 Frederick I (24 April 1417 – 29 November 1480)
 Rupert (1420 – 17 October 1478)
 Stephen (1421 – 4 September 1485) Canon in Strasbourg, Mainz, Cologne, Speyer and Liège
 Louis I (1424 – 19 July 1489)
 John (1429–1475), Archbishop of Magdeburg

Ancestry

References 

1385 births
1459 deaths
House of Palatinate-Zweibrücken
House of Palatinate-Simmern
Counts Palatine of Zweibrücken
Sons of kings